Bagdad Cafe is an American television sitcom starring Whoopi Goldberg and Jean Stapleton that aired on CBS. The series premiered March 30, 1990, and ran two seasons before being cancelled in winter 1990. The last two episodes aired in July 1991. The show is based on the 1987 Percy Adlon film Bagdad Cafe.

Cast
 Whoopi Goldberg as Brenda
 Jean Stapleton as Jasmine
 James Gammon as Rudy
 Monica Calhoun as Debbie
 Scott Lawrence as Juney
 Cleavon Little as Sal

In this version, Jasmine was not German.

Production
The series was shot in the conventional sitcom format, in front of a studio audience. The show did not obtain a sizable audience, being forced to compete with ABC's Top 20 hit Family Matters and was cancelled after two seasons.

Insiders say that production of the series ended on November 16, 1990, after a dispute between Goldberg and the show's co-executive producer, Thad Mumford. Executive producer Kenneth Kaufman was told that Goldberg called CBS president Jeff Sagansky in late November to say that she was quitting the show. With no time to recast Goldberg's role, CBS ended the series and pulled the remaining episodes from the broadcast schedule.

Episodes
Fifteen episodes were produced, and are registered with the United States Copyright Office.

Season 1 (1990)

Season 2 (1990–91)

Reception
Ken Tucker of Entertainment Weekly rated the series a C, saying that "rarely has a bad sitcom been better acted". Despite being impressed with the acting from Stapleton and Little, Tucker was disappointed that the producers did not hire better writers, to match the quality of the movie on which the series is based. Howard Rosenberg of the Los Angeles Times said the show's premiere "doesn't click tonight, it yields no laughs". However, John J. O'Connor of The New York Times remarks that "the stars seem to be enjoying themselves immensely", and compliments the director of the pilot noting, "Paul Bogart, a sitcom miracle worker, directs the first episode with enough aplomb to qualify himself as a master illusionist".

References

External links
 

1990 American television series debuts
1991 American television series endings
1990s American sitcoms
1990s American black sitcoms
CBS original programming
English-language television shows
Live action television shows based on films
Television shows set in California
Television series by New World Television
Television series by CBS Studios